Susan Seipel (born 4 April 1986) is an Australian Para-canoeist, a gold and bronze medallist in kayak and outrigger canoe at the 2015 and 2016 World Championships. She won a bronze medal at the 2016 Rio Paralympics and a silver medal at the 2020 Summer Paralympics.

Personal

Seipel, a Bellbowrie resident of Queensland, was born with Arthrogryposis Multiplex, a rare disorder characterised by fusion of joints and absent muscle formation in her legs. Born in Ipswich, Queensland she attended St Peter Claver College. In 2003, she completed Information Technology certificates and in 2004, a TAFE course in horse management. In 2008, she completed a Diploma of Applied Science, Equine Studies Major at the University of Queensland. She is undertaking a course in Professional Leadership at La Trobe University.

She is a volunteer and ambassador for  the RSPCA at Wacol, Queensland.

Sporting career

Swimming
Seipel's sporting career began at the age of four as part of her physiotherapy program. She learned to swim at the Bellbowrie Club and competed against her able-bodied classmates at Our lady of the Rosary Primary School, Kenmore. She held six Queensland State records between the age of 13-15 and three Australian National Age records in freestyle and backstroke.

Equestrian
At the age of seven, Seipel's sporting passion began to change after learning to ride horses at the McIntyre Riding Centre for the Disabled in the western suburbs of Brisbane. Seipel said: "We used to go past the Centre on the way to my school and I always saw the horses. I really loved animals and wanted to have a go there. My parents thought it would be good therapy and took me along."  In 1998, she competed for the first time at the National Riding for Disabled (RDA) Dressage Championships, where she gained first place in her warm- up test against international riders. After competing at these Championships for nine successive years, Seipel made her International debut at the FEI Pacific Rim Para-equestrian Dressage International, held at Milner Downs Equestrian Centre in Langley, Canada. It was here she gave her best performance winning a bronze medal and qualified for the 2008 Summer Paralympics Beijing,  China, but was not selected in the team to represent Australia.

Summary of equestrian achievements:  
Australian Para Dressage Team for the World Equestrian Games 2010
Australian Riding for the Disabled (RDA) National Dressage Champion 1999, 2006, 2008
Reserve Para Equestrian Dressage Champion 2010
Short listed for 2008 Beijing Paralympics
State Riding for the Disabled Queensland Dressage Champion 9 times
2007 Queensland Young Achiever for Sports Award
2009 Equestrian Australia National Para Dressage Development Squad
2010 Equestrian Australia National Para Dressage Elite Squad

In leaving Equestrian, Seipel said: "I did Equestrian for 18 years, competing at National and International level. I decided to take a break because it's quite an expensive sport".

Canoeing
In 2012, Seipel attended a Para-canoe 'come and try day'. She was encouraged to take up Para-canoeing by Australian Olympian Amanda Rankin. and in 2013 joined the Brisbane Canoeing Club. Seipel is classified a KL2 and competed at the 2014 ICF Canoe Sprint World Championships in Moscow where she finished sixth in the Women's KL2 (formerly TA) K1 200m.

Determined to pursue her competitive spirit, Seipel mastered the kayak (K1) and outrigger (V1) canoes winning in both boats at domestic trials. At the 2015 ICF Canoe Sprint World Championships in Milan Italy, she won the gold medal in the Women's V–1 200 m VL2 and bronze medal in the Women's K–1 200 m KL2, a 2016 Rio Paralympics event.

Following her success, and with the support of Australian Canoeing, Seipel decided to move from Brisbane to the Gold Coast Queensland, where she could train full-time with the national coach Andrea King and access the AIS training facilities at Varsity Lakes.

At the 2016 ICF Para-canoe World Championships, Duisburg, Germany, she won the gold medal in the Women's 200 m Vl2 and bronze medal in the Women's 200 m KL2, a Paralympic Games event.

Seipel won the bronze medal in the 200 m KL2  when paracanoe made its debut at the Rio Paralympics.

At the 2017 ICF Canoe Sprint World Championships, Račice, Czech Republic, she won the gold medal in Women's VL2 200m and finished fourth in the Women's KL2 200m. At the 2018 ICF Canoe Sprint World Championships, Montemor-o-Velho, Portugal, she finished sixth in the Women's KL2 200m and fourth in the Women's VL2 200m.

At the 2019 ICF Canoe Sprint World Championships, Szeged, Hungary, she won the silver medal in the Women's VL2 200m and bronze medal in the Women's KL2 200m.

At the 2020 Summer Paralympics. Seipel won a silver medal in the Women's VL2 200m with a time of 1:01.481, over 4 seconds longer than the eventual winner Emma Wiggs of Great Britain. Seipel also competed in the Women's KL2 200m and came seventh.

Seipel finished fifth in both the Women's KL2 200m and VL2 200m at the 2022 ICF Canoe Sprint World Championships. 

In 2021, she was awarded Paddle Australia's Paracanoeist of the Year.

Seipel trains with the Brisbane Canoeing Club.

References

External links

Australian Canoeing profile

1986 births
Living people
Australian female canoeists
Paracanoeists of Australia
Paralympic medalists in paracanoe
Paralympic bronze medalists for Australia
Paralympic silver medalists for Australia
Paracanoeists at the 2016 Summer Paralympics
Paracanoeists at the 2020 Summer Paralympics
Medalists at the 2016 Summer Paralympics
Medalists at the 2020 Summer Paralympics
Sportswomen from Queensland
Sportspeople from Ipswich, Queensland
ICF Canoe Sprint World Championships medalists in paracanoe
21st-century Australian women